Jackson Township is a township in Monroe County, Pennsylvania, United States. The population was 6,561 at the 2020 census. A portion of Big Pocono State Park a Pennsylvania state park is on Camelback Mountain in Jackson Township.

Geography

Demographics

As of the census of 2000, there were 5,979 people, 2,128 households, and 1,634 families residing in the township. The population density was 203.4 people per square mile (78.5/km2). There were 2,744 housing units at an average density of 93.4/sq mi (36.0/km2). The racial makeup of the township was 91.74% White, 3.36% African American, 0.30% Native American, 1.20% Asian, 0.12% Pacific Islander, 1.92% from other races, and 1.35% from two or more races. Hispanic or Latino of any race were 4.62% of the population.

There were 2,128 households, out of which 37.5% had children under the age of 18 living with them, 67.8% were married couples living together, 5.9% had a female householder with no husband present, and 23.2% were non-families. 17.6% of all households were made up of individuals, and 6.2% had someone living alone who was 65 years of age or older. The average household size was 2.78 and the average family size was 3.17.

In the township the population was spread out, with 27.6% under the age of 18, 5.4% from 18 to 24, 29.4% from 25 to 44, 26.2% from 45 to 64, and 11.5% who were 65 years of age or older. The median age was 39 years. For every 100 females, there were 96.5 males. For every 100 females age 18 and over, there were 94.9 males.

The median income for a household in the township was $52,327, and the median income for a family was $57,745. Males had a median income of $42,000 versus $27,101 for females. The per capita income for the township was $21,472. About 4.2% of families and 6.3% of the population were below the poverty line, including 6.4% of those under age 18 and 9.2% of those age 65 or over.

Climate

According to the Trewartha climate classification system, Jackson Township has a Temperate Continental climate (Dc) with warm summers (b), cold winters (o) and year-around precipitation (Dcbo). Dcbo climates are characterized by at least one month having an average mean temperature ≤ , four to seven months with an average mean temperature ≥ , all months with an average mean temperature <  and no significant precipitation difference between seasons. Although most summer days are slightly humid in Jackson Township, episodes of heat and high humidity can occur with heat index values > . July is the peak month for thunderstorm activity, which correlates with the average warmest month of the year. The average wettest month is September, which correlates with tropical storm remnants during the peak of the Atlantic hurricane season. Since 1981, the wettest calendar day was 6.51 inches (165 mm) on September 30, 2010. Episodes of extreme cold and wind can occur, with wind chill values < . The average snowiest month is January, which correlates with the average coldest month of the year. Ice storms and large snowstorms depositing ≥ 12 inches (30 cm) of snow occur once every couple of years, particularly during nor’easters from December through March.

Transportation

Interstate 80 is the most prominent highway traversing Jackson Township. It follows an east-west alignment across the northern corner of the township, including part of the interchange with Interstate 380, but the nearest interchanges with local roads are in neighboring townships. Pennsylvania Route 715 is the sole numbered highway providing direct local access to the township. It follows a southwest-northeast alignment through the center of the township.

Ecology

According to the A. W. Kuchler U.S. potential natural vegetation types, Jackson Township would have a dominant vegetation type of Appalachian Oak (104) with a dominant vegetation form of Eastern Hardwood Forest (25). The peak spring bloom typically occurs in late-April and peak fall color usually occurs in mid-October.

References

Pocono Mountains
Townships in Monroe County, Pennsylvania
Townships in Pennsylvania